Sindhutai Sapkal (14 November 1948 – 4 January 2022) was an Indian social worker and social activist known particularly for her work in raising orphaned children in India. She was awarded the Padma Shri in 2021 in Social Work category.

Early life 
Sapkal was born on 14 November 1948, in Pimpri Meghe village in Wardha district in the then Central Provinces and Berar of India to Abhimanyu Sathe, a cowherder. Being an unwanted child, she was referred to as Chindhi (Marathi for "piece of rag"). Abject poverty, family responsibilities and an early marriage forced her to quit formal education after she successfully passed the fourth standard. Sapkal was married off at age 12 to Shrihari Sapkal, who was 20 years older than her, and moved to Nawargaon village, Seloo in Wardha. The marriage did not last long and at the age of 20, she was left on her own to care for a girl child.

Early work with Adivasis 
Sindhutai Sapkal later found herself in Chikhaldara, where she started begging  for food. In the process, she realised that there were many children abandoned by their parents and she adopted them as her own. She had to beg even harder to feed ever the larger family. She decided to become a mother to everyone who came across to her as an orphan. She later gave away her own daughter to the Shrimant Dagdu Sheth Halwai trust of Pune, to eliminate the feeling of partiality between her own child and the adopted children.

Details of Sapkal's struggle were provided in the weekly Optimist Citizen on 18 May 2016:
 

Sapkal fought for the rehabilitation of eighty-four villages. In the course of her agitation, she met Chhedilal Gupta, the then Minister of Forests. He agreed that the villagers should not be displaced before the government had made appropriate arrangements at alternative sites. When Prime Minister Indira Gandhi arrived to inaugurate the tiger project, Sapkal showed her photographs of an Adivasi who had lost his eyes to a wild bear. She is quoted as saying, "I told her that the forest department paid compensation if a cow or a hen was killed by a wild animal, so why not a human being? She immediately ordered compensation."

After being informed of the plight of orphaned and abandoned Adivasi children, Sapkal took care of the children in return for meager amounts of food. Shortly thereafter, it become the mission of her life.

Orphanages 
Sapkal devoted herself to orphans. As a result, she was fondly called "Mai", which means "mother". She nurtured over 1,500 orphaned children and through them had a grand family of 382 sons-in-law and 49 daughters-in-law. She has been honoured with more than 700 awards for her work. She used award money to buy land to make a home for orphaned children.

Organisations
 Mother Global Foundation Pune
 Sanmati Bal Niketan, Bhelhekar Vasti, Manjri, Hadapsar, Pune
 Mamata Bal Sadan, Kumbharvalan near Saswad, Purandar taluka (started in 1994)
 Savitribai Phule Mulinche Vasatigruh (Girls' Hostel) Chikhaldara, Amravati
 Abhiman Bal Bhavan, Wardha
 Gangadharbaba Chhatralaya, Guha shirdi
 Saptsindhu' Mahila Adhar, Balsangopan Aani Shikshan Sanstha, Pune
 Shree Manshanti Chatralaya, Shirur
 Vanvasi Gopal Krishna Bahuuddeshiya Mandal Amaravati

Death
She died of a heart attack in Pune, Maharashtra, on 4 January 2022, at the age of 73.

Awards 

 2021 - Padma Shri in Social work category
 2017 – Nari Shakti Puraskar from the President Of India
 2016 – Honorary doctorate by the Dr. D.Y. Patil College of Engineering, Pune
 2016 – Social Worker of the Year award from Wockhardt Foundation
 2014 – Ahmadiyya Muslim Peace Prize
 2013 – Mother Teresa Awards for Social Justice
 2013 – The National Award for Iconic Mother 
 2012 – Real Heroes Awards, given by CNN-IBN and Reliance Foundation.
 2012 – COEP Gaurav Puraskar, given by College of Engineering, Pune.
 2010 – Ahilyabai Holkar Award, given by the Government of Maharashtra to social workers in the field of women and child welfare
 2008 – Women of the Year Award, given by daily Marathi newspaper Loksatta
 1996 – Dattak Mata Purskar, given by Non Profit Organization Sunita Kalaniketan Trust

 Sahyadri Hirkani Award
 Rajai Award
 Shivlila Mahila Gaurav Award

Film
The 2010 Marathi film Mee Sindhutai Sapkal by Anant Mahadevan is a biopic inspired by the true story of Sindhutai Sapkal. The film was selected for world premiere at the 54th London Film Festival.

References

1948 births
2022 deaths
Social workers
Marathi people
Activists from Maharashtra
People from Pune
20th-century Indian women
20th-century Indian educators
Indian children's rights activists
Indian women activists
Adivasi activists
People from Wardha district
Social workers from Maharashtra
Women educators from Maharashtra
Educators from Maharashtra
20th-century women educators
Recipients of the Padma Shri in social work
Recipients of the Ahmadiyya Muslim Peace Prize